Francesca Fenocchio (born 9 December 1978) is an Italian paralympic cyclist who won a silver medal at the 2012 Summer Paralympics.

References

External links
 

1978 births
Living people
Paralympic cyclists of Italy
Paralympic silver medalists for Italy
Medalists at the 2012 Summer Paralympics
Paralympic medalists in cycling
Cyclists at the 2012 Summer Paralympics